Maurizio Merluzzo (born September 3, 1986) is an Italian voice actor and YouTuber. He contributes to voicing characters in anime, cartoons, movies and other media.

Biography
Merluzzo's most relevant works include voicing Shazam in the movie Shazam!, Sai in the Italian version of the anime Naruto: Shippuden, André Harris in the Nickelodeon sitcom Victorious, Zamasu in Dragon Ball Super and Ragnar in History's TV show Vikings.

The dubbing studios he works at include Merak Film, ADC Group and Raflesia.

Merluzzo is also a YouTuber and he's acted in the web series Cotto e Frullato and Getalive. He also took a part in the song Bestie di Seitan, along with the Italian parody heavy metal band Nanowar of Steel and in the song L'Ingranaggio di Cristallo with the Italian band Dymama. Both songs were used as the soundtrack of the feature film Cotto & Frullato Z – The Crystal Gear, directed by Paolo Cellammare, in which Merluzzo also played the lead role.

In 2019, Maurizio dubbed the American actor Zachary Levi the movie Shazam!, making it the first time he dubbed a title character on the big screen.

In 2021, Maurizio played the role of Capitan Findus in Nanowar of Steel's video for La Maledizione di Capitan Findus alongside Marco Arata (Mark the Hammer)

Voice work

Movies
Billy Batson / Shazam in Shazam!
Matt Smith in Last night in Soho
Austin Butler in Elvis

Video games
Klonoa in Klonoa
Knuckles the Echidna in the Sonic the Hedgehog series
Rehgar Earthfury in World of Warcraft/Heroes of the Storm
Mortiferous in World of Warcraft
Demon Hunter in Diablo 3
Reggie in Far Cry 4
Ezreal in League of Legends
Jacob Frye in Assassin's Creed Syndicate
Daniel Cross in Assassin's Creed III
Jack Cooper in Titanfall 2
Griff in Call of Duty: Infinite Warfare
Jäger in Tom Clancy's Rainbow Six Siege
Helis in Horizon Zero Dawn
Tennessee Kid Cooper in Sly Cooper: Thieves in Time
Anarky in Batman: Arkham Origins
Steve Cortez in Mass Effect 3
Harris Brecken in Dying Light
Liu Kang in Mortal Kombat X
Baptiste in Overwatch
Troy Calypso in Borderlands 3

Anime and animation
 Shun Kurosaki (Shay) in Yu-Gi-Oh! Arc-V
 Mirio Togata in My Hero Academia
 Paul in Pokémon
 Oga Tatsumi in Beelzebub
 Sai in Naruto: Shippuden
 Keith Clay/Spectra Phantom in Bakugan Battle Brawlers: New Vestroia
 William in Code Lyoko
 William in Puppy in My Pocket: Adventures in Pocketville
 Akatsuki Kain in Vampire Knight
 Akatsuki Kain in Vampire Knight Guilty
 Katsuo Mizuno in The Prince of Tennis
 Akatsuki Izumo in Aria the Animation
 Tatsuya Mizuno in Whistle!
 Curio in Romeo x Juliet
 Ling Yao in Fullmetal Alchemist: Brotherhood
 Marcel in Yu-Gi-Oh! GX
 Abengane in Hunter x Hunter
 Lambo (adult) in Reborn!
 Renji Abarai in Bleach: Memories of Nobody
 Renji Abarai in Bleach: The DiamondDust Rebellion
 Riichi Jinnouchi in Summer Wars
 Dash in The Twisted Whiskers Show
 Jason James/Z-Strap in Zevo-3
 Kurt Wagner/Nightcrawler in Wolverine and the X-Men
 Naomi Minamoto in Capeta
 Hajime Kakei in Special A
 Klaus Warwick in Code Geass: Akito the Exiled
 Lord Boros in One Punch Man
 Coby (adult) in One Piece
 Hamelin in MÄR
 Zamasu in Dragon Ball Super
 Buddy Fury in Inazuma Eleven Go Galaxy
Archer in Fate/Stay Night: Heaven's feel-Presage flower
 Archer in Fate/Stay Night: Unlimited Blade Works
 Cancer Manigoldo in Saint Seiya: The Lost Canvas
Pip Bernadotte in Hellsing Ultimate

Live-action series
 Andre Harris in Victorious
  Ram Ramachandran in How to Be Indie
 DS James Hathaway in Lewis
 Markus Zastrow in Sturm der Liebe
 Bryson in My Life as Liz
 Raul Clavatti in Isa TKM
 Guido Lassen in Rebelde Way
 Darryl Smith in Sea Patrol (1st dub)
 Jimmy Madigan in True Jackson, VP
 Milky in This Is England
 Toby in Mega Mindy
 Colin O'Flaherty in Worst.Prom.Ever.
 Ragnar Lothbrok in Vikings
 Jonathan Scott in Property Brothers, Brother vs. Brother
 Kevin in A series of unfortunate events
 Barry in Van Helsing (TV series)
 "Number Two" Diego Hargreeves in The Umbrella Academy
 Dr. Benjamin Ettenberg in The Marvelous Mrs. Maisel

References

External links
 

Living people
People from Prato
Italian male video game actors
Italian male voice actors
Italian YouTubers
1986 births
21st-century Italian male actors